Belgium national team can refer to:

 Belgium national baseball team
 Belgium men's national basketball team
 Belgium women's national basketball team
 Belgium Davis Cup team (tennis men)
 Belgium Billie Jean King Cup team (tennis women)
 Belgium national football team
 Belgium women's national football team
 Belgium national under-21 football team
 Belgium national football B team
 Belgium national under-17 football team
 Belgium national under-19 football team
 Belgium national beach soccer team
 Belgium national futsal team
 Belgium men's national handball team
 Belgium women's national handball team
 Belgium men's national field hockey team
 Belgium women's national field hockey team
 Belgium men's national ice hockey team
 Belgium women's national ice hockey team
 Belgium national korfball team
 Belgium national rugby sevens team
 Belgium national rugby league team
 Belgium national rugby union team
 Belgium women's national rugby union team
 Belgium men's national volleyball team
 Belgium women's national volleyball team
 Belgium men's national water polo team
 Belgium women's national water polo team